Lily Lyoonjung Lee (born September 26, 1969) is a Korean-American former competitive figure skater. She represented South Korea at the 1994 Winter Olympics.

Personal life
Born in Seoul, South Korea, Lily Lee moved to the United States as a child and was raised in Alexandria, Virginia. She holds dual citizenship.

Career
Lee was coached by Kathy Casey in Colorado Springs, Colorado. In the 1980s, she competed on the national level in the United States, winning the 1987 Eastern Sectionals and qualifying several times for the U.S. Figure Skating Championships.

Toward the end of the 1980s, Lee began appearing internationally for South Korea while still living and training in the United States. She won the bronze medal at the 1989 Golden Spin of Zagreb and competed at six World Championships, achieving her best result, 17th, in 1990. She was selected to represent South Korea at the 1994 Winter Olympics and finished 21st. She received special media attention for being in the same practice group as Nancy Kerrigan and Tonya Harding.

Results

References

1969 births
Living people
South Korean emigrants to the United States
South Korean female single skaters
American female single skaters
Figure skaters at the 1994 Winter Olympics
Olympic figure skaters of South Korea
Sportspeople from Alexandria, Virginia
American sportspeople of Korean descent
Figure skaters from Seoul
21st-century American women